Rear-Admiral Thomas Lennox Frederick (25 March 1750 – 7 October 1799) was an officer in the Royal Navy who served during the American War of Independence and the French Revolutionary Wars. He was a highly educated officer and a very greatly esteemed seaman, rising to the rank of rear-admiral of the red.

Early life 
He was born on 25 March 1750, in the parish of St George's, Hanover Square. He was the son of Sir Charles Frederick, the Surveyor-General of the Ordnance, and Lucy Boscawen. His grandfather was Sir John Frederick. Thomas first went to sea in 1768, under Captain Peter Parker.

American War of Independence 
On 4 September 1780 he was in command of Unicorn when he had the misfortune of encountering, in a fog off Tortuga, a French frigate and two ships of the line that captured him. The subsequent court martial honourably acquitted Frederick for the loss of his ship, and in October 1781 he received command of the 44-gun frigate .

Years of peace 
From May 1790 to September 1791 Thomas Frederick commanded the 44-gun .

French Revolutionary Wars 
He was present with Admiral Lord Hood at the Siege of Toulon, and as a commanding officer of his ship, he saw action at the Battle of Genoa against the French fleet. His ship fought two French third rates, defeating both of them, and was so damaged that  had to take her in tow. She was then caught in a storm on her return to port and grounded. Although other British vessels arrived they were unable to get her off. The British set her on fire and abandoned her.

Frederick's next command, in June 1795, was the 90-gun , which took part in the long blockade off Toulon. While in command he saw action at the Battle of Cape Saint Vincent, where the outnumbered British squadron under Sir John Jervis defeated the Spanish fleet. After taking a convoy to Lisbon, Frederick joined Jervis, Earl St. Vincent, on the resumption of the blockade of Cadiz. 

Frederick was promoted to rear-admiral of the blue on 20 February 1797. In the autumn of 1798 he returned to Great Britain and later that year he raised his flag in the 98-gun . He later commanded the 90-gun , which paid off in September 1799. Unfortunately, Frederick's health had severely deteriorated and he died on 7 October 1799 in Nottingham Place, London.

Notes

References

External links 
 Thomas Frederick at threedecks.org

1750 births
1799 deaths
Royal Navy rear admirals
Royal Navy personnel of the American Revolutionary War
Royal Navy personnel of the French Revolutionary Wars
British naval commanders of the Napoleonic Wars
Military personnel from London
People from the City of Westminster